The General Secretary of the TUC is the chief permanent officer of the Trades Union Congress, and a major figurehead in the trade union movement in the United Kingdom.

The Secretary is responsible for the effective operation of the TUC and for leading implementation of policies set by the annual Congress and the organisation's General Council. They also serve as the TUC's chief representative, both with the public and with other organisations.

The position was formed in 1921, when the Parliamentary Committee of the TUC became the General Council. The position of Secretary has been a permanent, full-time position in the TUC since 1904. Before that, the Secretary was elected annually at Congress.

Between January 2013 and Janurary 2023, the incumbent position was held by Frances O'Grady, the first woman to hold the post. O'Grady was succeeded by Paul Nowak, the Deputy General Secretary during O'Grady's leadership, on 1 January 2023. 
The current General Secretary of the TUC is Paul Nowak.

Secretaries of the Parliamentary Committee of the TUC
W. H. Wood (1868–1869)
George Potter (1869–1872)
George Odger (1872–1873)
George Howell (1873–1876)
Henry Broadhurst (1876–1885)
George Shipton (1885–1886)
Henry Broadhurst (1886–1890)
Charles Fenwick (1890–1894)
Sam Woods (1894–1905)
W. C. Steadman (1905–1911)
C. W. Bowerman (1911–1921)

General Secretaries of the TUC
Status

Deputy General Secretaries of the TUC
1977: Norman Willis
1985: Kenneth Graham
1987: John Monks
1993: Brendan Barber
2003: Frances O'Grady
2013: Post vacant
2016: Paul Nowak
2022: Post vacant

Assistant General Secretaries of the TUC
1917: Fred Bramley
1924: Walter Citrine
1926: Alec Firth
1931: Vincent Tewson
1947: George Woodcock
1960: Vic Feather
1969: Len Murray
1973: Norman Willis
1978: Kenneth Graham and David Lea
1985: Roy Jackson and David Lea
1992: David Lea
1999: Post vacant
2003: Kay Carberry
2013: Kay Carberry and Paul Nowak
2016: Post vacant
2022: Kate Bell

See also
President of the Trades Union Congress

References

 
Lists of British people
Lists of office-holders in the United Kingdom
 
Trades Union Congress